Elena Donati (born 26 January 1974) is an Italian breaststroke swimmer. She competed in two events at the 1992 Summer Olympics.

References

External links
 

1974 births
Living people
Italian female breaststroke swimmers
Olympic swimmers of Italy
Swimmers at the 1992 Summer Olympics
Place of birth missing (living people)
Mediterranean Games medalists in swimming
Mediterranean Games gold medalists for Italy
Mediterranean Games silver medalists for Italy
Swimmers at the 1991 Mediterranean Games
Swimmers at the 1993 Mediterranean Games
20th-century Italian women